Tetrahedron is a weekly peer-reviewed scientific journal covering the field of organic chemistry. According to the Journal Citation Reports, Tetrahedron has a 2020 impact factor of 2.457. Tetrahedron and Elsevier, its publisher, support an annual symposium. In 2010, complaints were raised over its high subscription cost.

Notable papers 
, the Web of Science lists ten papers from Tetrahedron that have more than 1000 citations. The four articles that have been cited more than 2000 times are:
  – cited 2228 times
  – cited 2162 times
  – cited 2124 times
  – cited 2107 times

See also 
 Tetrahedron Letters
 Tetrahedron Computer Methodology
 Polyhedron (journal)

References

External links 
 

Chemistry journals
Elsevier academic journals
Publications established in 1957
Weekly journals
English-language journals